Guatemala has a network of  narrow gauge railroads, passenger and freight trains currently run.

History 

Construction of the first railway in Guatemala commenced in 1877 and the first section began operation in 1880, connecting Puerto San José and Escuintla, being extended to Guatemala City in 1884.  San Jose-Guatemala City-Zacapa is nowadays abandoned 
and removed. The line to Puerto Barrios, known originally as Northern Railroad of Guatemala and now(2020)also removed, was completed in 1908. The network was soon acquired by United Fruit, and in 1912 renamed the  International Railways of Central America which was also known as IRCA. The railroad prospered until 1957. In 1954, United Fruit had to divest following an antitrust suit and in 1959, a parallel highway caused a serious competitive pressure. In 1968, the company defaulted, was taken over by the government and renamed Ferrocarriles de Guatemala which was also known as FEGUA. The condition of tracks continued to deteriorate and all traffic was shut down in 1996. Only nostalgic tourist trains (by Trains Unlimited) ran on parts of the network in 1997 and 1998.

Revival
In October 1997, a 50-year concession was given to Railroad Development Corporation (RDC) which started to rehabilitate the network. They were delayed by the need to evict squatters who built their cottages on the right-of-way during the previous years and to repair damage caused by thieves and nature. A serious blow was Hurricane Mitch in 1998, which destroyed parts of the line. The first train under RDC management went from Guatemala City to El Chile cement plant on April 15, 1999, and the rest of the line to Puerto Barrios was put into operation in December of that year. Other lines previously existing in Guatemala (such as to Ciudad Tecún Umán on the border with Mexico, to Anguiatú in El Salvador and to Puerto San José) have not been repaired since 1996. Including those, the railroad network would have counted .

From 1999 until September 2007, Ferrovías Guatemala (FVG), as a subsidiary of RDC, operated 15 engines and 200 railcars on freight trains between Guatemala City and Puerto Barrios. It connected Guatemala City to Puerto Barrios with short branches in Guatemala City container terminal and Puerto Santo Tomás.

Suspension of operations in 2007 
In August 2006, the government of Guatemala declared a 2003 contract for the usufruct of rolling  stock and other equipment as contrary to public interest (:es:Declaración de lesividad), invalidating it. FVG believed that this was a response to its earlier request for arbitration regarding the usage of 2 million USD from National Railroad Trust, designated for the development of railroads in Guatemala but used to support an overstaffed governmental oversight agency.

The result of the governmental action was a decline of shipments and operational difficulties, such as inability to obtain credit or take additional revenues from the leasing of station buildings or right of way. In March 2007, RDC declared its intent to seek protection of investment through arbitration against the government of Guatemala according to Chapter 10 of CAFTA. The case was registered with ICSID on August 20, 2007 with number ARB/07/23. Due to the continuing uncertainty leading to losses, FVG decided to suspend all operations as of October 1, 2007 while continuing with legal actions against the Guatemalan government. The arbitration case was finally decided in favor of RDC and US$14.6m paid as compensation. , most of the bridges have been dismantled and sold for scrap by thieves, making a potential revival of railways in Guatemala difficult, as it would cost millions of dollars to rebuild.

In August 2012, there were proposals to start some new passenger services, including a link from La Aurora airport to Guatemala City.

Ferrocarril de Los Altos 

Outside of the IRCA network, an electric railroad Ferrocarril de Los Altos used to connect Quetzaltenango and Retalhuleu between 1930 and 1933. It was destroyed by a hurricane in 1933 and never rebuilt. The remains are on display in a dedicated museum in Quetzaltenango.

Ferrocarril Verapaz 
Another isolated railroad, Ferrocarril Verapaz (also known as Ferropazco), used to connect Panzós and Tucurú in Alta Verapaz Department. Its construction was authorized in 1884 and completed in 1895. Its main purpose was to transport coffee from farms (fincas) controlled mainly by Germans to the port of Panzós on Polochic River, which merged to Lago de Izabal and the Caribbean Sea. The company was nationalized in 1943. In 1956, the government created a national company Ferrocarril Verapaz y Servicios Anexos. Operations along Ferrocarril Verapaz y Servicios Anexos stopped in 1963.

Tourist trains

Charter passenger trains with steam engines, mainly for European and U.S. tourists, were organized usually once a year by UK based Ffestiniog Travel or other operators. Traffic control used a modified Track warrant Control method. The main station in Guatemala city also serves as railroad museum.

Railway museum

The Museo del Ferrocarril FEGUA is located in the railway station at Guatemala City and displays steam engines, a diesel engine, passenger and freight cars, and other memorabilia of the Ferrocarriles de Guatemala.

Proposed light rail

A light rail system called Metro Riel is planned for Guatemala City.

Railway links with adjacent countries 
 Mexico – at Ciudad Tecún Umán break of gauge /. (rebuilt as standard gauge in 2019
 There is no connection to Belize or Honduras, but still proposed. 
 The former link to El Salvador – at Angulatú/San Jerónimo – is not active.

In Books 
Adventure traveler Richard Halliburton described Guatemala's former main railroad line in New Worlds to Conquer (1929).  Travel writer Paul Theroux described his journey by train through Guatemala in his book The Old Patagonian Express, as he traveled from Boston to Patagonia.

See also 
 
 Guatemala
 Transportation in Guatemala
 Rail transport by country

References

External links 

 
 Ferrovías Guatemala – current operator of Guatemalan railroads (more links imbedded inside)
 Ferrocarril de Los Altos – history, 17 photographs, 2 maps
 Report from a tourist train trip with map, gradient profile and photographs
 Overview of rail in Guatemala with contact addresses, photographs and links
 Germans in Verapaz, article in Prensa Libre with a picture of Ferrocarril Verapaz

 
3 ft gauge railways in Guatemala